The Is Born collection of Television series produced for the Discovery Channel and made by i2i Television in the UK, presented by Mark Evans.

Each series follows Evans through either the building or restoring of a vehicle

Series

Cars 
 A Car is Born - Pilgrim Sumo 5.7 litre V8 super car (AC Cobra kitcar)
 A Car is Reborn - 1965 series 1.1 E-Type Jaguar
 A Racing Car is Born - Westfield 1800
 A 4x4 is Born - 1985 four-door Land Rover
 An MG is Born - 1973 MGB Roadster

Bikes 
 A Bike is Born - Custom Trike
 A Bike is Born - 1970 Triumph Bonneville T120R
 A Bike is Born - 1942 Harley Davidson

Aircraft 
 A Plane Is Born - Europa XS
 A Chopper is Born - Rotorway Exec 162F

See also 
 Wreck Rescue (Mark Evans 2007 Discovery Channel show where he "inspires and motivates" five amateur vehicle restorers to bring their projects to completion.)

External links 
Mark Evans store - Is Born DVDs
 An MG is Born information website
 An 4x4 is Born information website 
 Wreck Rescue information website

2000s British television series
Vehicle modification media
Motorcycle television series
Discovery Channel original programming